The following is a list of mayors of the city of Aguachica, Colombia.

See also

List of Governors of the Cesar Department

Notes

External links
 Aguachica official website

Politics of Aguachica
Politics of Colombian municipalities
Lists of mayors